The Frank Sinatra Open Invitational was a PGA Tour event that was played at the Canyon Club in Palm Springs, California. It was played for only a single year—1963—although it was intended to be an annual affair. The five-day event was designed to allow the heavyweights in golf and show business to come together and pay tribute to the icon who meant so much to both industries. The four-day golf tournament was followed by a black-tie gala in the ballroom of the Palm Springs Riviera Hotel.

The tournament was won by a then 24-year-old in his second year on Tour, Frank Beard, after having to Monday qualify. It was Beard's first win at an official PGA Tour event. First place prize money was $9,000, which was in the upper echelon for winner's earnings in 1963.

Winner

References

Former PGA Tour events
Golf in California